Maltanner Creek flows into West Canada Creek in Middleville in Herkimer County, New York. The historic Route 29 Stone Arch Bridge crosses the South Branch Maltanner Creek.

References

Rivers of New York (state)
Rivers of Herkimer County, New York